Era Uma Vez... (English title: Once Upon a Time) is a Brazilian telenovela produced by Estúdios Globo and aired by Globo from March 30 to October 2, 1998 in 161 chapters, replacing Anjo Mau and being replaced by Pecado Capital. It was written by Walther Negrão and directed by Jorge Fernando.

Cast

External links
 

1998 telenovelas
Brazilian telenovelas
TV Globo telenovelas
1998 Brazilian television series debuts
1998 Brazilian television series endings
Portuguese-language telenovelas